Gupo station is a station on the Gyeongbu Line It is located in northern Busan, South Korea, and was opened on 1 January 1905. Many trains stop here. It is also connected with the subway station Gupo station on Busan Metro Line 3 via an overhead bridge, so passengers can transfer to Busan Subway Line 3.

It is a train station between Hwamyeong Station and Sasang Station.

On January 1, 1905, the operation of the operation was started as a temporary operation station. It was adjusted to the office building in 1991 and began operating the KTX in 2004. KTX, ITX-Saemaeul and Mugunghwa-ho trains run and are in charge of passenger and ticket sales.

History 
 January 1, 1905: Start of operation as a driving station
 December 30, 1985: Present history completion.
 August 16, 1989: The East-West Transit Train (Gupo-Haeundae) Passenger handling began.
 January 7, 1991: Coordinated to the officer's office
 December 2, 2002: Abolish the East-West Transit Railway.
 April 1, 2004: KTX Stopping
 November 15, 2006: Stop handling cargo handling

See also
Transportation in South Korea
Busan Metro

References

Railway stations in Busan
Buk District, Busan
Railway stations in Korea opened in 1905
Korea Train Express stations
1905 establishments in Korea